Karoonjhar Mountains are located in south-eastern edge of the Tharparkar district in Sindh, Pakistan. The range is approximately 19 kilometers long and reaches a height of 305 meters, and contains vaste deposits of granite and Chinese clay.

Geography

Karoonjhar mountains are located in Nagarparkar near the district Tharparkar on the northern edge of the Rann of Kutch. They mostly consist of granite rock and are likely an extension of the Aravalli Range of India. The Aravalli range belongs to Archaen period, which makes it one of the oldest rock systems. Specialists have put the time period of the formation of these rocks at between 3.5 and 5 billion years ago.

The Karoonjhar area is geographically different from the surrounding desert and is very limited in expanse. The mountain range is around 19 kilometers long and 305 meters high. To the east of the main range lie smaller hills which are covered with sparse vegetation. From these hills originate two perennial springs, Achleshwar and Sardharo, and temporary streams, Bhetiani and Gordhro, which flow during the rainy season.

Climate
Karoonjhar Dam is being constructed to supply water to people of Nagarparkar area. In the monsoon season, rainwater pours down from the mountain and flows in more than twenty streams, Bhatiani, Maoo, Gordaro, Ranaser, Sukhpur, Ghatiari, Madanwah, Moondaro, Bhodeser, Lolrai, Drah, Puranwah to the Rann of Kutch. The climate of this mountain range is extreme due to rocky terrain. August and September are only cool months due to monsoon.

Economic significance
Karoonjhar has economic significance for the local people of the area, it is rich in deposits and plant medicinal values. These plants include shatavari, okra and wild onion. This mountain is economically so significant that there is a local saying "Karoonjhar yields a hundred kilos of gold regularly".

History

Karoonjhar has been mentioned in many verses of Sindhi and Gujarati poets. Myths and lores of Sadwant & Sharanga, Hothlal Pari (nature's fairy), Odho Jam (Sindhi lore) and Bherio Garori (wolf's ring) are regarded to this range. Hothlal Pari is considered to have had appeared first in the Karoonjhar mountains. In old times, Karoonjhar was also famously known as "Kinro". The mountain range has several places of historical importance, like Bhodeser Talao, Alakh Wao (hidden well), Anchlechure, Sardaro, Gao Mukhi, Punraj Gadr, Nani, Chandan gadr, Bhaun jo bheesro, Jharno and Bhaunro. In the past, many individuals were exiled to the Karoonjhar by monarchs of nearby states.

The range was once a stronghold of Jainism in the region. Researcher Mashkoor Phulkaro has written that there are at least 108 holy sites among the surrounding hills Until 1226, the region of Thar was part of a large sea, and the current desert area served as a port and business centre for Jains who formed the business class. Subsequently, an earthquake in Parinagar, the main shipping port, changed its geography, forcing the Jains to move to Kutch and Bhuj in modern day India. Before their exodus, they had built several temples at Karoonjhar Mountain, Nagarparkar, and Parinagar. Of those, just four exist today, and only two of them are in good condition (in Veerawah and Nagarparkar). The last Jain family to leave this area did so in 1971.

See also
 Churrio Jabal Durga Mata Temple

References

Mountains and hills of Sindh
Tharparkar District